is a passenger railway station in located in the city of Shima,  Mie Prefecture, Japan, operated by the private railway operator Kintetsu Railway.

Lines
Shima-Yokoyama Station is served by the Shima Line, and is located 61.9 rail kilometers from the terminus of the line at Ise-Nakagawa Station.

Station layout
The station was consists of two opposed side platforms connected by a level crossing. There is no station building. The station is unattended.

Platforms

Adjacent stations

History
The line was one of six private companies consolidated into Mie Kotsu by order of the Japanese government on February 11, 1944. The station was renamed to its present name in December 1946. When Mie Kotsu dissolved on February 1, 1964, the station became part of the Mie Electric Railway, which was then acquired by Kintetsu on April 1, 1965.

Passenger statistics
In fiscal 2019, the station was used by an average of 43 passengers daily (boarding passengers only).

Surrounding area
Shima Hospital
Mt. Yokoyama look-out point

See also
List of railway stations in Japan

References

External links

 Kintetsu: Shima-Yokoyama Station 

Railway stations in Japan opened in 1929
Railway stations in Mie Prefecture
Stations of Kintetsu Railway
Shima, Mie